Nucleoporin 107 (Nup107) is a protein that in humans is encoded by the NUP107 gene.

Function 

This gene encodes a member of the nucleoporin family. The protein is localized to the nuclear rim and is an essential component of the nuclear pore complex (NPC). All molecules entering or leaving the nucleus either diffuse through or are actively transported by the NPC. Alternate transcriptional splice variants of this gene have been observed but have not been thoroughly characterized.

Interactions 

NUP107 has been shown to interact with NUP133.

References

Further reading 

 
 
 
 
 
 
 
 
 
 
 
 
 
 
 

Nuclear pore complex